The Billy Cotton Band Show was a Sunday lunchtime radio programme broadcast in the BBC Light Programme from 1949 until 1968.

The band leader, Billy Cotton, was a larger-than-life Cockney character who started each show with the cry "Wakey-Wake-aaaay!”, followed by the band's signature tune “Somebody Stole My Gal”.

The show transferred to BBC Television in 1956, usually on Saturday evenings at 7.00 pm. It ran, under various names, until 1968.
 
Regular entertainers included Alan Breeze, Kathie Kay, and the pianist Russ Conway. Pianist Mrs Mills made her first television appearance on the show. An additional regular act was the Leslie Roberts Silhouettes, recruited to the line-up before the television series began

Terry Jones and Michael Palin, both later to become members of Monty Python's Flying Circus, wrote jokes for the show.

References

Links
 

 
BBC Television shows
1949 establishments in the United Kingdom
1968 disestablishments in the United Kingdom
1950s British music television series
1960s British music television series
BBC Light Programme programmes